The 17th Sustainment Brigade (17 Sust Brigade) currently commands the Australian Army's deployable operational level logistics units. Raised on 20 May 2006, the brigade was formerly known as the Logistic Support Force (LSF), and is made up of varied logistic corps and trades. It encompasses both reserve and full-time units, geographically dispersed throughout Australia. Headquartered in Sydney, New South Wales its primary deployable command element is the Force Sustainment Group. The units of the brigade are responsible for providing third line or 'general' support within an area of operations. The brigade was designated the 17th Combat Service Support Brigade until 1 August 2019, when it was renamed the 17th Sustainment Brigade.

Current structure
The brigade consists of the following units and sub units:
 145th Signals Squadron
 2nd Force Support Battalion (reserve)
 9th Force Support Battalion
 10th Force Support Battalion
 1st Close Health Battalion
 2nd General Health Battalion
 3rd Health Support Battalion
 4th Health Support Battalion
On 2 October 2018 the 1st Military Police Battalion transitioned from 17th Brigade to the 6th Brigade so it is aligned with other theatre-level combat support capabilities that are already under the command of 6th Brigade. The 1st Psychology Unit was removed from the brigade's order of battle on 19 November 2021, when it was disbanded as part of a restructuring of the Army's health assets, which will eventually see the establishment of a dedicated health brigade in 2023. 
On 3 February 2022, 1st Close Health Battalion, 2nd General Health Battalion and 3rd Health Support Battalion were announced to be disbanded and replaced with 1st Health Battalion on 3 February, 2nd Health Battalion on 15 February and 3rd Health Battalion on 22 February. Also announced a new battalion 4th Health Battalion was to be raised on 17 February

Notes

References

Brigades of Australia
Military units and formations established in 2006
Military logistics units and formations of the Australian Army

fr:17e Brigade (Australie)